Dirac is a commune in the Charente department in the Nouvelle-Aquitaine region in southwestern France.

Population

See also
Communes of the Charente department

References

Communes of Charente
Charente communes articles needing translation from French Wikipedia